The Wehrmacht Long Service Award was a military service decoration of Nazi Germany issued for satisfactory completion of a number of years in military service.

History
On 16 March, 1936, Adolf Hitler ordered the institution of a service award in four classes, each class reflecting the completion of a select number of years of military service. 

The award was bestowed by each branch of the Wehrmacht (army, navy, and air force) and was issued for four years service (fourth class – silver medal), 12 years (third class – gold medal), 18 years (second class – silver cross), 25 years (first class – gold cross), and 40 years (special class). The 40 year special class was introduced on 10 March 1939.

Recipients of the higher level awards wore the decoration simultaneously with one lower year award. The manner they were worn was:
3rd Class with 4th Class (gold medal with silver medal)
2nd Class with 4th Class (silver cross with silver medal)
1st Class with 3rd Class (gold cross with gold medal).

The Long Service Award was retroactive throughout a service member's career, encompassing Reichswehr service as well as service dating during and before World War I. As such, there were a handful of 40 year awards presented, even though the Nazi era only lasted 12 years (1933-1945).

The awards were worn on the left chest, immediately before the medals commemorating the annexation of Austria, Sudetenland and Memel.

Design
The awards were designed by Professor Dr Richard Klein.

Apart from their finish, (gilt or silver), the third and fourth class medals have a common obverse. Both are 30mm in diameter and bear the German eagle clutching a swastika, surrounded by the words Treue Dienste in der Wehrmacht (Loyal service in the armed forces). The reverse shows the number of years of service, either '4' or '12', surrounded by a wreath.Likewise, the design of the first and second class crosses are similar. Both bear the German eagle on the obverse center, with the years of service, '18' or '25', on the reverse. The first class is gilt and 38mm wide – the second silver and 35mm. The 40 year award is identical to the first class, with the addition of a gilt oakleaf cluster to the ribbon.

Wehrmacht Long Service Awards were among Nazi era awards reauthorised for wear in 1957, re-designed to remove the now banned swastika symbol.

Ribbons
The medal used the cornflower blue ribbon of the pre-1918 . The recipient's arm of service was indicated by an emblem on the ribbon: a spread eagle and swastika for the army and Kriegsmarine, and a flying eagle and swastika for the Luftwaffe, the emblem corresponding in color with the metal of the award.

Other long service awards
The SS maintained their own Long Service Award given in grades of four years, eight years, 12 years, and 25 years. The Nazi Party and German Police had a similar service award. The Nazi Party Long Service Award was given in grades of ten, 15, and 25 years. The Police Long Service Award was given in grades of eight, 18, 25, and 40 years (though the last class was never awarded).

See also 

Orders, decorations, and medals of Nazi Germany

Notes

References 

Military awards and decorations of Nazi Germany
Awards established in 1936
1936 establishments in Germany
Long service medals